VUF-8430 is a histamine agonist selective for the H4 subtype.

References 

Histamine agonists
Guanidines
Thioureas